Blk Sonshine is a jazz duo featuring Malawian-born Masauko Chipembere and the South African Neo Muyanga.

The group was formed when Chipembere, who had been raised in the United States, traveled to South Africa to explore its jazz traditions, uniting with Muyanga to produce an album under Russell Pope. Released in 1998, their eponymous album was distributed by Fresh records and BMC music, proving particularly successful in South Africa, where it charged at number 6 and launched the #1 single "Building." Their follow-up album, Good Life, was recorded internationally and released in 2009.

Muyanga and Chipembere do not live in the same country and pursue their own solo projects, but continue to collaborate as Blk Sonshine, including live performances and guest appearances, as on an upcoming album with RZA of Wu-Tang Clan.

Songs
Borders 
Soul Smile 
Building
Agitation
Born in a taxi

Discography
Blk Sonshine - 1998, highest position: 20 weeks on Top 20, highest position was 6 on charts.
Good Life - 2009 (Sony/BMG)

References

Malawian musical groups
South African musical duos
South African jazz ensembles